The Cruel Sea is a 1963 song by The Dakotas. It made #18 on the UK Singles Chart.  The song was written by Mike Maxfield, the Dakotas' lead guitarist. In the U.S. the track was initially released as "The Cruel Surf" (Liberty 55618).

Cover versions
The Ventures covered it on their album The Fabulous Ventures and as the B-side to "Walk, Don't Run '64".
The Challengers on their 1965 album Go Sidewalk Surfing!.
California Guitar Trio on their 2008 album Echoes.

Documentary
In 2001, the track was featured in the documentary Produced by George Martin.

References

Songs about oceans and seas
1963 singles
1963 songs
Parlophone singles
Song recordings produced by George Martin